Elemental Parts One & Two: Chrysanthe & Violetta is an EP by Demdike Stare, released on December 7, 2011 by Modern Love Records.

Track listing

Personnel
Adapted from the Elemental Parts One & Two: Chrysanthe & Violetta liner notes.

Demdike Stare
 Sean Canty – producer
 Miles Whittaker – producer

Production and additional personnel
 Andreas Lubich – mastering
 Radu Prepeleac – design
 Andy Votel – cover art

Release history

References 

2011 EPs
Demdike Stare albums
Modern Love Records albums
Instrumental EPs